The Newberry Library is an independent research library, specializing in the humanities and located on Washington Square in Chicago, Illinois.  It has been free and open to the public since 1887. Its collections encompass a variety of topics related to the history and cultural production of Western Europe and the Americas over the last six centuries. The Library is named to honor the founding bequest from the estate of philanthropist Walter Loomis Newberry.  Core collection strengths support research in several subject areas, including maps, travel, and exploration; music from the Renaissance to the early twentieth century; early contact between Western colonizers and Indigenous peoples in the Western Hemisphere; the personal papers of twentieth-century American journalists; the history of printing; and genealogy and local history.

Although the Newberry is a noncirculating library, it welcomes researchers into the reading rooms who are at least 14 years old or in the ninth grade, and have a research topic corresponding to the nature of the collections. Additional public services are offered through exhibitions, meet-the-author lectures, adult education seminars, and other programming.

History

The Newberry was established in 1887 as the result of a bequest by Walter Loomis Newberry, an early Chicago resident and business leader involved in banking, shipping, real estate, and other commercial ventures. Newberry died at sea in 1868, while on a trip to France. He included in his will a provision of funds for the creation of a "free public library" should his daughters die without heirs. They did, and so, following the death of Newberry's widow, Julia Butler Newberry, in 1885, it was up to Newberry estate trustees William H. Bradley and Eliphalet W. Blatchford to bring the library to fruition.

Without much direction (Newberry did not leave behind many details regarding his vision for the library) and without its founder's personal collection as a foundation (Newberry's own collection of books perished in the Great Fire of 1871), the first officers and staff members were instrumental in forming the character of the Newberry.

The Newberry's first librarian, William Frederick Poole, was a major figure in the library world when he came to the Newberry. Poole saw the Newberry as a blank canvas on which he could project his ideas, which included and perhaps found their most impassioned articulation in the design and construction of libraries.  In 1887–88 it was located at 90 La Salle Street, in 1889–90 at 338 Ontario Street, and in 1890-93 at the northwest corner of State and Oak Streets. The present building, designed by Poole and architect Henry Ives Cobb (1859–1931), opened in 1893. It is located at 60 West Walton Street, across from Washington Square. It is a structure in the Spanish Romanesque architectural style, built of Connecticut granite.

Poole and Cobb feuded bitterly over their different visions for the library building. Poole favored a number of reading rooms with open shelving of materials that could be easily accessed by patrons; Cobb preferred the majestic grandiosity in vogue in Europe and the centralization of collection items. Poole's influence with the library's trustees coerced Cobb to temper the grand staircase he had envisioned and to accommodate open shelving. Over time, however, the open shelving would put too much strain on the Newberry's staff and the security of its collections, and the library would convert to a centralized storage system.

Poole served as Newberry librarian until his death in 1894. Under his leadership, the library built broad reference collections that would be useful to many different Chicagoans, especially professionals and tradespeople. The Newberry's medical department, created in 1890, is an example of this emphasis. Poole also steered the Newberry toward the acquisition of rare materials for use by professional scholars. Two en bloc acquisitions made during his tenure, the private collections of Henry Probasco and Count Pio Resse, yielded notable rarities in music and early printed specimens (incunables), as well as Shakespeare folios and editions of Homer, Dante, and Horace.

To focus its own collecting and to avoid the duplication of resources in Chicago at large, the Newberry entered into a cooperative agreement in 1896 with the Chicago Public Library and the John Crerar Library, by which each institution would specialize in certain fields of knowledge and areas of service. As a consequence, the Newberry came to specialize in the humanities, and the natural sciences became the province of the Crerar. The Newberry immediately transferred its holdings in this area, including its copy of Audubon's Birds of America. The Newberry's medical department was transferred to the Crerar in 1906.

Stanley Pargellis, the fifth Newberry librarian (1942–1962), emphasized not just the "passive" collection of materials but also the active orchestration of programs and events to encourage scholarly inquiries into the insights those materials might contain. Under Pargellis, a fellowship program was inaugurated and academic conferences were held at the Newberry, out of which emerged new scholarship using the library's collections. Pargellis also expanded the scope of the collection. Understanding the important role corporations played in American life and believing that those corporations could only be properly assessed if their records were freely accessible, Pargellis started a trend across the library world with the acquisition of the Chicago, Burlington & Quincy Railroad Company's private archives. Since this acquisition, in 1943, the Newberry would continue to add to its CB&Q archives, while collecting the records of other major corporations of the Midwest.

Between 1962 and 1986, the library was greatly expanded under the leadership of president Lawrence William "Bill" Towner. During this time, the Newberry acquired many important collections and a stacks building dedicated to the storage of collection items was constructed. Four new research centers were formed with support from the National Endowment for the Humanities. The research centers continue to support and produce important scholarship in their fields, while providing programming for more general audiences. They are the Center for Renaissance Studies, the D'Arcy McNickle Center for American Indian and Indigenous Studies, the Hermon Dunlap Smith Center for the History of Cartography, and the William M. Scholl Center for American History and Culture. Under Towner the library assembled a major collection on Herman Melville and co-sponsored the Northwestern-Newberry Melville Edition. The Newberry cooperated with the Chicago Historical Society in creating the 2004 Encyclopedia of Chicago, a landmark single-volume work that covered the city's history from 1630 to 2000.

In 2017–18, the lobby spaces of the library underwent a $12 million renovation to improve visitor access and exhibition space.

Services

The library houses more than 1.5 million books, 5 million manuscript pages, and 500,000 historic maps.  Collection strengths include materials on the European Renaissance, genealogy, Indigenous peoples of the Americas, early music, cartography, the history of printing, Chicago history, railroad archives, Luso-Brazilian history, and Midwestern authors' manuscripts.  The Newberry's Modern Manuscript Collection includes work by Mike Royko, Elmo Scott Watson, Ben Hecht, Floyd Dell, Sherwood Anderson, Malcolm Cowley, John T. McCutcheon, and Fanny Butcher.  Among its items are a Shakespeare First Folio, correspondence from Thomas Jefferson, Oswald Cooper's sketches for the Cooper Black typeface, original woodblocks made by Thomas Bewick, a fur trade contract from 1692 containing one of the earliest references to "Chicagou," and the oldest copy in existence of the Popol Vuh.  It also houses a series of occult books, including the Book of Magical Charms, the Commonplace-Book, and the Cases of Conscience Concerning Witchcrafts, which it invites visitors to its website to translate and transcribe.

The Newberry also offers a variety of exhibitions, meet-the-author lectures, continuing education classes, concerts, teacher programs, and other public programming related to its collections. Exhibitions have featured Daniel Burnham's famous Plan of Chicago of 1909, artifacts of World War I, and a crowd-sourced aggregation of materials related to love, from heart-shaped Renaissance maps to early twentieth-century American sheet music.

The Newberry's Research and Academic Programs Division offers short- and long-term fellowships for local, national, and international scholars, in addition to managing two separate semester-long seminars for undergraduate students. The four research centers foster, generate, and disseminate scholarship in their areas of focus: medieval, early modern, and Renaissance studies; American Indian and Indigenous Studies; the history of cartography; and American history and culture.

Reference staff are available in the Newberry's two reading rooms and in its third-floor reference room whenever the library is open. Reference librarians work with all readers and offer orientation, in-depth bibliographical instruction, and specialized assistance as needed. The library is open to all researchers over 14 years of age.

The Atlas of Historical County Boundaries Project, a historical GIS project that aims to map every county boundary configuration in the United States from the early seventeenth century to the present, is also based at the Newberry.

The Newberry Bookstore, located in the lobby of the library, curates a selection of books reflecting the Newberry's collection strengths and upcoming public programming, while offering other goods such as cards, posters, and literary action figures.

Newberry Library Award 
In 1987, the Newberry established the Newberry Library Award in honor of its 100th anniversary. The Newberry Library Award is an honor bestowed to individuals, and in the case of the Andrew W. Mellon Foundation, organizations, who have made "outstanding contributions to the humanities, particularly in fields of endeavor related to the Newberry’s collection." The award itself is a scale-sized model of the full-sized Virginio Ferrari sculpture created in 1987 called Umanitá that greets visitors as they enter the Newberry Library.

 1987: Paul Oskar Kristeller
 1990: Jaroslav Pelikan
 Richard J. Franke
 Ann Ida Gannon
 Lawrence Stone
 2006: Hanna Holborn Gray
 2007: Richard M. Daley
 2008: Anthony Grafton
 2009: William Cronon
 2010: Jonathan Spence
 2011: Robert Darnton
 2012: Francis Christopher Oakley
 2013: David McCullough
 2014: Roger Baskes
 2015: Stacy Schiff
 2016: Andrew W. Mellon Foundation
 2017: Martin E. Marty
 2018: Carla Hayden
 2019: Marilynne Robinson
 2021: Lonnie G. Bunch III

See also

Bughouse Square Debates
Newbery Medal, an unrelated award

References

Further reading
 Campbell, D'Ann, and Richard Jensen. "Community and Family History at the Newberry Library: Some Solutions to a National Need." History Teacher (1977): 47-54. in JSTOR
 Coale, Robert Peerling. "Evaluation of a research library collection: Latin-American colonial history at the Newberry." The Library Quarterly (1965): 173-184.
 Davis, Donald G. Dictionary of American Library Biography. "Towner, Lawrence William, 1921-1992."
 Horowitz, Helen Lefkowitz. Culture & the City: Cultural Philanthropy in Chicago from the 1880s to 1917 (University Press of Kentucky, 1976)
 Jensen, Richard. "The Accomplishments of the Newberry Library Family and Community History Programs: An Interview with Richard Jensen" The Public Historian (Autumn, 1983) 5#4 pp: 49-61 in JSTOR

Primary sources
 Butler, Ruth Lapham. A check list of manuscripts in the Edward E. Ayer collection (Newberry library, 1937)
 Mohr, Carolyn Curtis. Guide to the Illinois Central archives in the Newberry Library, 1851-1906 (Newberry Library, 1951)
 "Back to Adam," a Survey of Genealogy in the Western World as Illustrated N the Collections of the Newberry Library, Chicago, Illinois: An Exhibition Catalogue (Newberry Library, 1992)

External links

 
Digital Newberry – online access to more than one million digitized items from the Newberry's collections
 Newberry Library on Encyclopedia of Chicago
 Chicago Foreign Language Press Survey selected news articles from the foreign language press from 1855 to 1938.

Library buildings completed in 1893
Libraries established in 1887
Libraries in Chicago
Literary archives in the United States
Research libraries in the United States
Romanesque Revival architecture in Illinois
Tourist attractions in Chicago
Rare book libraries in the United States
Special collections libraries in the United States